Ivan Gentizon (born 24 February 1973) is a retired Swiss football midfielder.

References

1973 births
Living people
Swiss men's footballers
FC Chiasso players
FC Lugano players
FC Locarno players
Association football midfielders
Swiss Super League players